Abbas Barfi (also Romanized as ‘Abbās Barfī; also known as Abbās Bar, ‘Abbās Barfī-ye Soflá, and ‘Abbās Barqī) is a village in Pishkuh-e Zalaqi Rural District, Besharat District, Aligudarz County, Lorestan Province, Iran. At the 2006 census, its population was 203, in 38 families. As of 2020, the population was 504.

References 

Towns and villages in Aligudarz County